American Airlines is a major US-based airline headquartered in Fort Worth, Texas, within the Dallas–Fort Worth metroplex. It is the largest airline in the world when measured by fleet size, scheduled passengers carried, and revenue passenger mile. American, together with its regional partners and affiliates, operates an extensive international and domestic network with almost 6,800 flights per day to nearly 350 destinations in more than 50 countries. American Airlines is a founding member of the Oneworld alliance, the third-largest airline alliance in the world. Regional service is operated by independent and subsidiary carriers under the brand name American Eagle.

American Airlines and American Eagle operate out of 10 hubs, with Dallas/Fort Worth (DFW) being its largest. The airline handles more than 200 million passengers annually with an average of more than 500,000 passengers daily. As of 2021, the company employs 123,400 staff members.

History 

American Airlines was started in 1930 via a union of more than eighty small airlines. The two organizations from which American Airlines was originated were Robertson Aircraft Corporation and Colonial Air Transport.  The former was first created in Missouri in 1921, with both being merged in 1929 into holding company The Aviation Corporation.  This, in turn, was made in 1930 into an operating company and rebranded as American Airways.  In 1934, when new laws and attrition of mail contracts forced many airlines to reorganize, the corporation redid its routes into a connected system and was renamed American Airlines.  Between 1970 and 2000, the company grew into being an international carrier, purchasing Trans World Airlines in 2001.

American had a direct role in the development of the DC-3, which resulted from a marathon telephone call from American Airlines CEO C. R. Smith to Douglas Aircraft Company founder Donald Wills Douglas Sr., when Smith persuaded a reluctant Douglas to design a sleeper aircraft based on the DC-2 to replace American's Curtiss Condor II biplanes. Douglas agreed to go ahead with development only after Smith informed him of American's intention to purchase 20 aircraft. The prototype DST (Douglas Sleeper Transport) first flew on December 17, 1935, (the 32nd anniversary of the Wright Brothers' flight at Kitty Hawk). There was no prototype DC-3; the first DC-3 built followed seven DSTs off the production line and was delivered to American Airlines. American Airlines inaugurated passenger service on June 26, 1936, with simultaneous flights from Newark, New Jersey, and Chicago, Illinois.

American also had a direct role in the development of the DC-10, which resulted from a specification from American Airlines to manufacturers in 1966 to offer a widebody aircraft that was smaller than the Boeing 747, but capable of flying similar long-range routes from airports with shorter runways. McDonnell Douglas responded with the DC-10 trijet shortly after the two companies' merger. On February 19, 1968, the president of American Airlines, George A. Spater, and James S. McDonnell of McDonnell Douglas announced American's intention to acquire the DC-10. American Airlines ordered 25 DC-10s in its first order. The DC-10 made its first flight on August 29, 1970, and received its type certificate from the FAA on July 29, 1971. On August 5, 1971, the DC-10 entered commercial service with American Airlines on a round trip flight between Los Angeles and Chicago.

In 2011, due to a downturn in the airline industry, American Airlines' parent company AMR Corporation filed for bankruptcy protection. In 2013, American Airlines merged with US Airways but kept the American Airlines name, as it was the better-recognized brand internationally; the combination of the two airlines resulted in the creation of the largest airline in the United States, and ultimately the world.

Destinations and hubs

Destinations

As of July 2022, American Airlines flies to 269 domestic destinations and 81 international destinations in 48 countries (as of January 2022) in five continents.

Hubs

American currently operates ten hubs.
 Charlotte – American's hub for the southeastern United States and secondary Caribbean gateway. Its operations in Concourse E are the largest regional flight operation in the world. American has about 91% of the market share at CLT, making it the largest carrier at the airport. Former US Airways hub.
 Chicago–O'Hare – American's hub for the Midwest. American has about 35% of the market share at O'Hare, making it the airport's second largest airline after United.
 Dallas/Fort Worth – American's hub for the southern United States and largest hub overall. American currently has about 87% of the market share at DFW, making it the largest carrier at the airport. American's corporate headquarters are also in Fort Worth near the airport. DFW serves as American's primary Transpacific hub, primary gateway to Mexico, and secondary gateway to Latin America.
 Los Angeles – American's hub for the West Coast and secondary transpacific gateway.
 Miami – American's primary Latin American and Caribbean hub. American has about 68% of the market share at Miami International, making it the largest airline at the airport.
 New York–JFK – American's primary transatlantic hub. Mostly serves destinations with a lot of business traffic. American has about 12% of the market share at JFK, making it the third largest carrier at the airport behind Delta and JetBlue.
 New York–LaGuardia – American's second New York hub.
 Philadelphia – American's primary Northeast domestic hub and secondary transatlantic hub, primarily for London, Paris, and leisure destinations in Western and Southern Europe. American has about 70% of the market share at PHL, making it the airport's largest airline. Former US Airways hub.
 Phoenix–Sky Harbor – American's Rocky Mountain hub. Currently American has about 33% of the market share at PHX, making it the airport's second-largest airline. Former US Airways hub.
 Washington–Reagan – American's hub for the capital of the United States. American has about 49% of the market share at DCA, making it the largest carrier at the airport. Former US Airways hub.

Alliance and codeshare agreements
American Airlines is a member of the Oneworld alliance and has codeshares with the following airlines:

 Aer Lingus
 Air Tahiti Nui
 Alaska Airlines
 Cape Air
 Cathay Pacific
 China Southern Airlines
 El Al
 Fiji Airways
 Gol Transportes Aéreos
 Hawaiian Airlines
 IndiGo
 JetBlue
 JetSmart
 Jetstar Airways
 Jetstar Japan
 LEVEL
 Malaysia Airlines
 Qatar Airways
 Royal Air Maroc
 Royal Jordanian
 Seaborne Airlines
 Silver Airways
 SriLankan Airlines
 Vueling

Joint ventures
In addition to the above codeshares, American Airlines has entered into joint ventures with the following airlines:
 British Airways
 Finnair
 Iberia
 Japan Airlines
 Qantas

Fleet 

As of January 2023, American Airlines operates the largest commercial fleet in the world, comprising 933 aircraft from both Boeing and Airbus, with an additional 161 planned or on order.

Over 80% of American's aircraft are narrow-bodies, mainly Airbus A320 series and the Boeing 737-800. It is the largest A320 series aircraft operator in the world, as well as the largest operator of the A319 and A321 variants. It is the fourth-largest operator of 737 family aircraft and second-largest operator of the 737-800 variant.

American's wide-body aircraft are all Boeing airliners. It is the third-largest operator of the Boeing 787 series and the sixth-largest operator of the Boeing 777 series.

American exclusively ordered Boeing aircraft throughout the 2000s. This strategy shifted on July 20, 2011, when American announced the largest combined aircraft order in history for 460 narrow-body jets including 260 aircraft from the Airbus A320 series. Additional Airbus aircraft joined the fleet in 2013 during the US Airways merger, which operated a nearly all Airbus fleet.

On August 16, 2022, American announced that a deal had been confirmed with Boom Supersonic to purchase at least 20 of their Overture supersonic airliners and potentially up to 60 in total.

American Airlines operates aircraft maintenance and repair bases at the Charlotte, Chicago O'Hare,  Dallas–Fort Worth, Pittsburgh (where all its Airbus narrowbody aircraft are maintained), and Tulsa airports.

Cabins 

Flagship First

Flagship First is American's international and transcontinental first class product. It is offered only on Boeing 777-300ERs and select Airbus A321s which American designates "A321T". The seats are fully lie-flat and offer direct aisle access with only one on each side of the aisle in each row. As with the airline's other premium cabins, Flagship First offers wider food and beverage options, larger seats, and lounge access at certain airports. American offers domestic Flagship First service on transcontinental routes between New York–JFK and Los Angeles, New York–JFK and San Francisco, New York-JFK and Santa Ana, Boston and Los Angeles, and Miami and Los Angeles, as well as on the standard domestic route between New York-JFK and Boston. The airline will debut new Flagship Suite® premium seats and a revamped aircraft interior for its long-haul fleet with fresh deliveries of its Airbus A321XLR and Boeing 787-9 aircraft, beginning in 2024.

Flagship Business

Flagship Business is American's international and transcontinental business class product. It is offered on all Boeing 777-200ERs, Boeing 777-300ERs, Boeing 787-8s, and Boeing 787-9s, as well as select Airbus A321s. All Flagship Business seats are fully lie-flat.

Domestic first class

First class is offered on all domestically configured aircraft.

Premium Economy is American's economy plus product. It is offered on all widebody aircraft. The cabin debuted on the airline's Boeing 787-9s in late 2016 and is also available on Boeing 777-200s and -300s, and Boeing 787-8s. Premium Economy seats are wider than seats in the main cabin (American's economy cabin) and provide more amenities: Premium Economy customers get two free checked bags, priority boarding, and enhanced food and drink service including free alcohol. This product made American Airlines the first U.S. carrier to offer a four-cabin aircraft.

Main Cabin Extra is American's enhanced economy product. It is available on all of the mainline fleet and American Eagle aircraft. Main Cabin Extra seats include greater pitch than is available in main cabin, along with free alcoholic beverages and boarding one group ahead of main cabin. American retained Main Cabin Extra when the new Premium Economy product entered service in late 2016.

Main Cabin

Main Cabin (economy class) is American's economy product and is found on all mainline and regional aircraft in its fleet. American markets a number of rows within the main cabin immediately behind Main Cabin Extra as "Main Cabin Preferred", which require an extra charge to select for those without status.

American Airlines marketed increased legroom in economy class as "More Room Throughout Coach", also referred to as "MRTC", starting in February 2000. Amid financial losses, this scheme was discontinued in 2004.

On many routes, American also offers Basic Economy, the airline's lowest main cabin fare. Basic Economy consists of a Main Cabin ticket with numerous restrictions including waiting until check-in for a seat assignment, no upgrades or refunds, and boarding in the last group. Originally Basic Economy passengers could only carry a personal item, but American later revised their Basic Economy policies to allow for a carry-on bag.

In May 2017, American announced it would be adding more seats to some of its Boeing 737 MAX 8 jets and reducing overall legroom in the basic economy class. The last three rows were to lose , going from the current . The remainder of the main cabin was to have  of legroom. This "Project Oasis" seating configuration has since been expanded to all 737 MAX 8s as well as standard Boeing 737-800 and non-transcontinental Airbus A321 jets. New Airbus A321neo jets have been delivered with the same configuration.

Reward programs

AAdvantage 

AAdvantage is the frequent flyer program for American Airlines. It was launched on May 1, 1981, and it remains the largest frequent flyer program with over 115 million members as of 2021. Miles accumulated in the program allow members to redeem tickets, upgrade service class, or obtain free or discounted car rentals, hotel stays, merchandise, or other products and services through partners. The most active members, based on the amount and price of travel booked, are designated AAdvantage Gold, AAdvantage Platinum, AAdvantage Platinum Pro, and AAdvantage Executive Platinum elite members, with privileges such as separate check-in, priority upgrade, and standby processing, or free upgrades. They also receive similar privileges from AA's partner airlines, particularly those in oneworld.

AAdvantage co-branded credit cards are also available and offer other benefits. The cards are issued by CitiCards, a subsidiary of Citigroup, Barclaycard, and Bilt card in the United States, by several banks including Butterfield Bank and Scotiabank in the Caribbean, and by Banco Santander in Brazil.

AAdvantage allows one-way redemption, starting at 7,500 miles.

Admirals Club 
The Admirals Club was conceived by AA president C.R. Smith as a marketing promotion shortly after he was made an honorary Texas Ranger. Inspired by the Kentucky colonels and other honorary title designations, Smith decided to make particularly valued passengers "admirals" of the "Flagship fleet" (AA called its aircraft "Flagships" at the time). The list of admirals included many celebrities, politicians, and other VIPs, as well as more "ordinary" customers who had been particularly loyal to the airline.

There was no physical Admirals Club until shortly after the opening of LaGuardia Airport. During the airport's construction, New York Mayor Fiorello LaGuardia had an upper-level lounge set aside for press conferences and business meetings. At one such press conference, he noted that the entire terminal was being offered for lease to airline tenants; after a reporter asked whether the lounge would be leased as well, LaGuardia replied that it would, and a vice president of AA immediately offered to lease the premises. The airline then procured a liquor license and began operating the lounge as the "Admirals Club" in 1939.

The second Admirals Club opened at Washington National Airport. Because it was illegal to sell alcohol in Virginia at the time, the club contained refrigerators for the use of its members, so they could store their liquor at the airport. For many years, membership in the Admirals Club (and most other airline lounges) was by the airline's invitation. After a passenger sued for discrimination, the club switched to a paid membership program in 1974.

Flagship Lounge 
Though affiliated with the Admirals Club and staffed by many of the same employees, the Flagship Lounge is a separate lounge specifically designed for customers flying in first class and business class on international flights and transcontinental domestic flights, as well as AAdvantage Concierge Key, Executive Platinum, Platinum Pro, and Platinum, as well as Oneworld Emerald and Sapphire frequent flyers. As of May 2019, Flagship Lounges are located at five airports: New York–JFK, Chicago-O'Hare, Miami International, Los Angeles, and Dallas/Fort Worth. Flagship Lounges are planned for London-Heathrow and Philadelphia.

Corporate affairs

Ownership and structure
American Airlines, Inc., is publicly traded through its parent company, American Airlines Group Inc., under NASDAQ: AAL , with a market capitalization of about $12 billion as of 2019, and is included in the S&P 500 index.

American Eagle is a network of six regional carriers that operate under a codeshare and service agreement with American, operating flights to destinations in the United States, Canada, the Caribbean, and Mexico. Three of these carriers are independent and three are subsidiaries of American Airlines Group: Envoy Air Inc., Piedmont Airlines, Inc., and PSA Airlines Inc.

Headquarters 

American Airlines is headquartered across several buildings in Fort Worth, Texas that it calls the "Robert L. Crandall Campus" in honor of former president and CEO Robert Crandall. The  square-foot, five-building office complex called was designed by Pelli Clarke Pelli Architects. The campus is located on 300 acres, adjacent to Dallas/Fort Worth International Airport, American's fortress hub.

Before it was headquartered in Texas, American Airlines was headquartered at 633 Third Avenue in the Murray Hill area of Midtown Manhattan, New York City. In 1979, American moved its headquarters to a site at Dallas/Fort Worth International Airport, which affected up to 1,300 jobs. Mayor of New York City Ed Koch described the move as a "betrayal" of New York City. American moved to two leased office buildings in Grand Prairie, Texas. On January 17, 1983, the airline finished moving into a $150 million ($ when adjusted for inflation),  facility in Fort Worth; $147 million (about $ when adjusted for inflation) in Dallas/Fort Worth International Airport bonds financed the headquarters. The airline began leasing the facility from the airport, which owns the facility. Following the merger of US Airways and American Airlines, the new company consolidated its corporate headquarters in Fort Worth, abandoning the US Airways headquarters in Phoenix, AZ.

As of 2015, American Airlines is the corporation with the largest presence in Fort Worth.

In 2015, American announced that it would build a new headquarters in Fort Worth. Groundbreaking began in the spring of 2016 and occupancy completed in September 2019. The airline plans to house 5,000 new workers in the building.

Construction of the new headquarters began after the demolition of the Sabre facility, previously on the site.

The airline considered developing a new headquarters in Irving, Texas, on the old Texas Stadium site, before deciding to keep the headquarters in Fort Worth.

Corporate identity

Logo 
In 1931, Goodrich Murphy, an American employee, designed the AA logo as an entry in a logo contest. The eagle in the logo was copied from a Scottish hotel brochure. The logo was redesigned by Massimo Vignelli in 1967. Thirty years later, in 1997, American Airlines was able to make its logo Internet-compatible by buying the domain AA.com. AA is also American's two-letter IATA airline designator.

On January 17, 2013, American launched a new rebranding and marketing campaign with FutureBrand dubbed, "A New American". This included a new logo, which includes elements of the 1967 logo.

American Airlines faced difficulty obtaining copyright registration for their 2013 logo. On June 3, 2016, American Airlines sought to register it with the United States Copyright Office, but in October of that year, the Copyright Office ruled that the logo was ineligible for copyright protection, as it did not pass the threshold of originality, and was thus in the public domain. American requested that the Copyright Office reconsider, but on January 8, 2018, the Copyright Office affirmed its initial determination. After American Airlines submitted additional materials, the Copyright Office reversed its decision on December 7, 2018, and ruled that the logo contained enough creativity to merit copyright protection.

Aircraft livery 
American's early liveries varied widely, but a common livery was adopted in the 1930s, featuring an eagle painted on the fuselage. The eagle became a symbol of the company and inspired the name of American Eagle Airlines. Propeller aircraft featured an international orange lightning bolt running down the length of the fuselage, which was replaced by a simpler orange stripe with the introduction of jets.

In the late 1960s, American commissioned designer Massimo Vignelli to develop a new livery. The original design called for a red, white, and blue stripe on the fuselage, and a simple "AA" logo, without an eagle, on the tail; instead, Vignelli created a highly stylized eagle, which remained the company's logo until January 16, 2013.

On January 17, 2013, American unveiled a new livery. Before then, American had been the only major U.S. airline to leave most of its aircraft surfaces unpainted. This was because C. R. Smith would not say he liked painted aircraft and refused to use any liveries that involved painting the entire plane. Robert "Bob" Crandall later justified the distinctive natural metal finish by noting that less paint reduced the aircraft's weight, thus saving on fuel costs.

In January 2013, American launched a new rebranding and marketing campaign dubbed, "The New American". In addition to a new logo, American Airlines introduced a new livery for its fleet. The airline calls the new livery and branding "a clean and modern update". The current design features an abstract American flag on the tail, along with a silver-painted fuselage, as a throw-back to the old livery. The new design was painted by Leading Edge Aviation Services in California. Doug Parker, the incoming CEO indicated that the new livery could be short-lived, stating that "maybe we need to do something slightly different than that ... The only reason this is an issue now is that they just did it right in the middle, which kind of makes it confusing, so that gives us an opportunity, actually, to decide if we are going to do something different because we have so many airplanes to paint". The current logo and livery have had mixed criticism, with Design Shack editor Joshua Johnson writing that they "boldly and proudly communicate the concepts of American pride and freedom wrapped into a shape that instantly makes you think about an airplane", and AskThePilot.com author Patrick Smith describing the logo as 'a linoleum knife poking through a shower curtain'. Later in January 2013, Bloomberg asked the designer of the 1968 American Airlines logo (Massimo Vignelli) on his opinion over the rebranding.

In the end, American let their employees decide the new livery's fate. On an internal website for employees, American posted two options, one the new livery and one a modified version of the old livery. All of the American Airlines Group employees (including US Airways and other affiliates) were able to vote. American ultimately decided to keep the new look. Parker announced that American would keep a US Airways and America West heritage aircraft in the fleet, with plans to add a heritage TWA aircraft and a heritage American plane with the old livery. As of September 2019, American has heritage aircraft for Piedmont, PSA, America West, US Airways, Reno Air, TWA, and AirCal in their fleet. They also have two AA branded heritage 737-800 aircraft, an AstroJet N905NN, and the polished aluminum livery used from 1967 to 2013, N921NN.

Worker relations 
The main representatives of key groups of employees are:
 The Allied Pilots Association is an in-house union which represents the nearly 15,000 American Airlines pilots; it was created in 1963 after the pilots left the Air Line Pilots Association (ALPA). However the majority of American Eagle pilots are ALPA members.
 The Association of Professional Flight Attendants represents American Airlines flight attendants, including former USAirways flight attendants.
 Flight attendants at wholly owned regional carriers (Envoy, Piedmont, and PSA) are all represented by Association of Flight Attendants – Communications Workers of America (AFA-CWA). US Airways flight attendants were active members of AFA-CWA before the merger, and they are honorary lifetime members. AFA-CWA is the largest flight attendant union in the industry.
 The Transport Workers Union-International Association of Machinists alliance (TWU-IAM) represents the majority of American Airlines employed fleet service agents, mechanics, and other ground workers.
 American's customer service and gate employees belong to the Communications Workers of America/International Brotherhood of Teamsters Passenger Service Association.

Concerns and conflicts

Environmental violations 
Between October 1993 to July 1998, American Airlines was repeatedly cited for using high-sulfur fuel in motor vehicles at 10 major airports around the country, a violation of the Clean Air Act.

Lifetime AAirpass 
Since 1981, as a means of creating revenue in a period of loss-making, American Airlines had offered a lifetime pass of unlimited travel, for the initial cost of $250,000. This entitled the pass holder to fly anywhere in the world. Twenty-eight were sold. However, after some time, the airline realized they were making losses on the tickets, with the ticketholders costing them up to $1 million each. Ticketholders were booking large numbers of flights with some ticketholders flying interstate for lunch or flying to London multiple times a month. AA raised the cost of the lifetime pass to $3 million, and then finally stopped offering it in 2003. AA then used litigation to cancel two of the lifetime offers, saying the passes "had been terminated due to fraudulent activity".

Cabin fume events 
 In 1988, on American Airlines Flight 132's approach into Nashville, flight attendants notified the cockpit that there was smoke in the cabin. The flight crew in the cockpit ignored the warning, as on a prior flight, a fume event had occurred due to a problem with the auxiliary power unit. However, the smoke on Flight 132 was caused by improperly packaged hazardous materials. According to the NTSB inquiry, the cockpit crew persistently refused to acknowledge that there was a serious threat to the aircraft or the passengers, even after they were told that the floor was becoming soft and passengers had to be reseated. As a result, the aircraft was not evacuated immediately on landing, exposing the crew and passengers to the threat of smoke and fire longer than necessary.
 On April 11, 2007, toxic smoke and oil fumes leaked into the aircraft cabin as American Airlines Flight 843 taxied to the gate. A flight attendant who was present in the cabin subsequently filed a lawsuit against Boeing, stating that she was diagnosed with neurotoxic disorder due to her exposure to the fumes, which caused her to experience memory loss, tremors, and severe headaches. She settled with the company in 2011.
 In 2009, Mike Holland, deputy chairman for radiation and environmental issues at the Allied Pilots Association and an American Airlines pilot, said that the pilot union had started alerting pilots of the danger of contaminated bleed air, including contacting crew members that the union thinks were exposed to contamination based on maintenance records and pilot logs.
 In a January 2017 incident on American Airlines Flight 1896, seven flight attendants were hospitalized after a strange odor was detected in the cabin. The Airbus A330 involved subsequently underwent a "thorough maintenance inspection", having been involved in three fume events in three months.
 In August 2018, American Airlines flight attendants picketed in front of the Fort Worth company headquarters over a change in sick day policy, complaining that exposure to ill passengers, toxic uniforms, toxic cabin air, radiation exposure, and other issues were causing them to be sick.
 In January 2019, two pilots and three flight attendants on Flight 1897 from Philadelphia to Fort Lauderdale were hospitalized following complaints of a strange odor.

Discrimination complaints 
On October 24, 2017, the NAACP issued a travel advisory for American Airlines urging African Americans to "exercise caution" when traveling with the airline. The NAACP issued the advisory after four incidents. In one incident, a black woman was moved from first class to coach while her white traveling companion was allowed to remain in first class. In another incident, a black man was forced to give up his seats after being confronted by two unruly white passengers. According to the NAACP, while they did receive complaints on other airlines, most of their complaints in the year before their advisory were on American Airlines. In July 2018, the NAACP lifted their travel advisory saying that American has made improvements to mitigate discrimination and unsafe treatment of African Americans.

Accidents and incidents 

As of March 2019, the airline has had almost sixty aircraft hull losses, beginning with the crash of an American Airways Ford 5-AT-C Trimotor in August 1931. Of these most were propeller driven aircraft, including three Lockheed L-188 Electra turboprop aircraft (of which one, the crash in 1959 of Flight 320, resulted in fatalities). The two accidents with the highest fatalities in both the airline's and U.S. aviation history were Flight 191 in 1979 and Flight 587 in 2001.

Out of the 17 hijackings of American Airlines flights, two aircraft were hijacked and destroyed in the September 11 attacks: Flight 11 crashed into the north facade of the North Tower of the World Trade Center, and Flight 77 crashed into the Pentagon; both were bound for LAX from Boston Logan International Airport and Washington Dulles International Airport respectively.
Other accidents include the Flight 383 engine failure and fire in 2016. There were two training flight accidents in which the crew were killed and six that resulted in no fatalities. Another four jet aircraft have been written off due to incidents while they were parked between flights or while undergoing maintenance.

Carbon footprint
American Airlines reported total CO2e emissions (direct and indirect) for the twelve months ending December 31, 2020, at 20,092 Kt (-21,347 /-51.5% y-o-y). The company aims to achieve net zero carbon emissions by 2050.

See also 
 AAirpass
 Air transportation in the United States
 List of airlines of the United States
 List of airports in the United States
 U.S. Airways, which merged with American Airlines in 2013

Notes and references
 Notes

 References

Further reading

External links 
 
 Official American Airlines Vacations website

 
1934 establishments in the United States
Airlines based in Texas
Airlines established in 1934
Airlines for America members
American Airlines Group
American companies established in 1934
Aviation in Arizona
Companies based in Fort Worth, Texas
Companies that filed for Chapter 11 bankruptcy in 2011